Sergio Carossio (born 29 October 1962 in Buenos Aires) is a former Argentine rugby union player. He played as a lock. Currently he works as physiotherapist and kinesiologist. He is currently member of UAR's Medical Staff.

Career
Always playing for Olivos Rugby Club from Vicente López
as lock, Carossio had a brief international experience with the Argentina national team, debuting in Pumas on 2 November 1985, at Buenos Aires during the historic tie against the All Blacks, then, for two years he was not called up anymore, until during the 1987 Rugby World Cup he played the rest of his matches, against Italy and New Zealand. In total, he played 3 matches for Argentina.

With the medical studies left behind, after the player career, he started his activity as physio therapist and entered the Olivos' medical staff; since 1998, he is in the same charge also in the Argentina national rugby union team, along with the charge of kinesitherapist.

Notes

External links

Olivos Rugby Club Coaching and Medical staff

1962 births
Living people
Argentine rugby union players
Rugby union locks
Argentina international rugby union players
Rugby union players from Buenos Aires